McKay Bay Nature Park is a  park in Tampa.

There is a  boardwalk trail through mangroves and mudflats, an observation tower that doubles as an education pavilion, a paved  multi-use trail and  nature trail. Picnic tables and interpretive signage are offered. The boardwalks remain closed since 2015.

The park is part of the larger  McKay Bay Preserve. Many species of wading birds forage, particularly in winter months. Birds may also be viewed with spotting scopes from either the park's observation tower/education pavilion, located on the east side, or the bird-viewing station on the west side.

McKay Bay Greenway
The preserved area is operated in a partnership between the City of Tampa, Hillsborough County and the Southwest Florida Water Management District. The land was purchased using the Hillsborough County ELAP Program in 1990 and a smaller parcel on the Palm River was purchased in 2000 by ELAPP and the State of Florida Greenways and Trails Program. A large tract of land along the southeast shoreline is owned by the Southwest Florida Water Management District, and used as a spoil disposal area for the Tampa Bypass Canal.

References

External links
 McKay Bay Nature Park - City of Tampa

Parks in Tampa, Florida
Protected areas of Hillsborough County, Florida
Nature reserves in Florida